Cameron Lyndon Bennett (born in September 1955 in Indianapolis, Indiana), better known as Bud Lee, is an American adult film director who is an AVN Hall of Fame member and also works as an agent for 101 Modeling, Inc.

Lee was married to adult film actresses Hyapatia Lee (1980–1992). and Asia Carrera (1995–2003). He took the last name of his first wife, Hyapatia Lee, as it is a Cherokee tradition for the husband to do so.

References

External links
 
 
 
 Interview at Adultdvdtalk.com

1955 births
Living people
American pornographic film directors
People from Indianapolis
Film directors from Indiana